Đặng Phương Nam is a retired Vietnamese footballer who played for Thể Công. He has been a member of the Vietnam national football team since 1996 to 2007. He is noted for his performances at the 1996, 2000, 2002, and 2006 Tiger Cups even though Vietnam was defeated at the group stage.

Honours
Super Cup championship: 1999
Asian Military Tiger Cup: 1998
Gold Championships National Championships 1998
Gold U21 Championships: 1997, 1998; 1999
Military Sea Asian Games: 1999
Tiger Cup Third place: 2002; 2007
Asia Cup National Military: 2004
Cup championship Military ASEAN: 2004
King's Cup Runners-up: 2006
Vietnam First Division: 2007

International goals

References

External links
 Phương Nam is not super man
 Phương Nam-The best man
 
 
Myanmar lose match for Dang Phuong Nam

Vietnamese footballers
1976 births
Living people
Southeast Asian Games silver medalists for Vietnam
Southeast Asian Games medalists in football
Viettel FC players
Association football forwards
Competitors at the 1999 Southeast Asian Games